Hsu Ching-yuan is a former Taiwanese politician. Huang served as a member of the Taitung County Council.  During his career he ran as a Chinese Nationalist Party (KMT) representative, an independent, and a People First Party (PFP) candidate while also forming an alliance with and campaigning for the Democratic Progressive Party (DPP). He rose to become Taitung County Magistrate from 2001-2005 before quitting in the middle of his reelection campaign in 2005 and disappearing from public life. It is believed he left Taiwan to live in Canada.

References

1957 births
Living people
Magistrates of Taitung County
People First Party Members of the Legislative Yuan
Kuomintang politicians in Taiwan
Members of the 4th Legislative Yuan
Taitung County Members of the Legislative Yuan